Tennholmen Lighthouse is a coastal lighthouse in Bodø Municipality in Nordland county, Norway.  It is located in the Vestfjorden on one of the Tennholman islands, just west of the Givær islands, about  due west of the town of Bodø.

The lighthouse is painted white and the light tower is red. The white light flashes once every 30 seconds. The light is active from dusk to dawn from 4 August until 2 May each year. The light is inactive during the summers due to the midnight sun in the region.

See also

Lighthouses in Norway
List of lighthouses in Norway

References

External links
 Norsk Fyrhistorisk Forening 
 Picture of Tennholmen Lighthouse

Lighthouses completed in 1901
Lighthouses in Nordland
Buildings and structures in Bodø
1901 establishments in Norway